The Belknap House, at 1206 North Nevada Street in Carson City, Nevada, is a historic house built in 1875. Also known as the Barber-Belknap House or the Beck-Barber-Belknap House, it includes Second Empire architecture.  It was listed on the National Register of Historic Places in 1997.

It is a two-story building with shiplap siding.  It is significant as the home, during 1881 to 1908, of Charles Henry Belknap, who was Chief Justice of the Nevada Supreme Court.  It is significant also for association with Henry Hudson Beck, who had it built in 1870, and to Oscar T. Barber, a businessman and Nevada State Assembly representative, who owned it in between.  And it is also significant as "an excellent example of a two-story Second Empire residential structure".

During the Cold War, the only known privately built atomic fallout shelter in Carson City was added to the property.

References 

Houses on the National Register of Historic Places in Nevada
Second Empire architecture in Nevada
Houses completed in 1875
National Register of Historic Places in Carson City, Nevada
Houses in Carson City, Nevada